John William "Dutch" Woudenberg, Jr. (May 25, 1918 – May 3, 2005) was a professional American football offensive and defensive lineman in the National Football League (NFL) and the All-America Football Conference (AAFC).

He was born and raised in Denver, Colorado. He played college football and wrestled at the University of Denver. He was affiliated with the Kappa Sigma fraternity at DU.

He was drafted by the Chicago Bears in the sixth round of the 1940 NFL Draft. He played for the Pittsburgh Steelers in 1940 through 1942. During World War II he served as an officer in the United States Navy. After the war he joined the AAFC's San Francisco 49ers in 1946 and played until 1949.

He was married in August 1943.

References

1918 births
2005 deaths
Players of American football from Denver
American football offensive tackles
American football defensive linemen
Denver Pioneers football players
Pittsburgh Pirates (football) players
Pittsburgh Steelers players
San Francisco 49ers (AAFC) players
United States Navy personnel of World War II
United States Navy officers
Saint Mary's Pre-Flight Air Devils football players
San Francisco 49ers players